The Greatest Love of All is a 1924 American silent drama film directed by George Beban and starring Beban and Jack W. Johnston.

Cast
 George Beban as Joe, the iceman
 Jack W. Johnston as 	District Attorney Kelland 
 Wanda Lyon as 	Mrs. Godfrey Kelland
 Baby Evelyn as Their daughter
 Nettie Belle Darby as 	Marie Simpkin, the maid
 Orestes A. Zangrilli a s	The Cobbler 
 Mary Skurkoy as Trina, his daughter
 Maria Di Benedetta as 	His 'Sweetheart'
 William Howatt as 	Presiding Judge
 John Koch Newman as 	Attorney for the Defense
 George Humbert as 	Interpreter
 Robert M. Doll as Court Officer

References

Bibliography
 Connelly, Robert B. The Silents: Silent Feature Films, 1910-36, Volume 40, Issue 2. December Press, 1998.
 Munden, Kenneth White. The American Film Institute Catalog of Motion Pictures Produced in the United States, Part 1. University of California Press, 1997.

External links
 

1924 films
1924 drama films
1920s English-language films
American silent feature films
Silent American drama films
American black-and-white films
Films directed by George Beban
Associated Exhibitors films
1920s American films